Jake Flint (1985 – November 27, 2022) was an American Red Dirt country singer.

Flint was raised in Holdenville, Oklahoma. His father, Douglas J. Flint, was a wildcat oilman. Flint moved with his family to Tulsa in the early 1990s, where he attended Metro Christian Academy.

Flint died in his sleep a few hours after his wedding to Brenda Flint, on November 27, 2022, at the age of 37.

Albums
I'm Not OK (2016)
Jake Flint (2020)

References 

1985 births
2022 deaths
American country singers
Singers from Oklahoma
People from Holdenville, Oklahoma